are an annual set of music awards, sponsored by the .

The awards are presented annually since 1968 and are based on requests from the audience received by cable broadcasters. The awards is finished in 2017, Kiyoshi Hikawa, who is a Japanese enka singer, keeps the record for most Grand Prix.

List of Grand Prix winners

Winners in other categories 
This is a partial list of artists who have won in other categories.
 AKB48 (Excellent Music Award and Special Award, 2011. Cable Music Excellence [Outstanding Performance] Award, 2012, 2013)
 Berryz Kobo (Cable Music Award, 2008)
 Cute (Cable Music Award, 2007)
 Kyary Pamyu Pamyu (Cable Music Excellence [Outstanding Performance] Award, 2013)

Most Wins Overall  
Including enka and pop artist.

References

External links 
 Japan Cable Awards - TBS
 
Japan Cable Awards - Cable ranking - Cansystem

Awards established in 1968
1968 establishments in Japan
Japanese music awards